The 2016–17 season was Al-Ahli's 41st consecutive season in the top flight of Saudi football and 79th year in existence as a football club. The club started the season facing Al-Hilal in the Saudi Super Cup, winning the game on penalties. As well as this, the club also competed in the Pro League, the AFC Champions League, and the two domestic cups, the Crown Prince Cup and the King Cup. They entered the season as defending champions of both the League and King Cup.

Players

Squad information

New contracts

Transfers

In

Summer

Winter

Out

Summer

Winter

Loan out

Summer

Winter

Overall transfer activity

Spending
Summer:  £2,980,000

Winter:  £975,000

Total:  £3,955,000

Income
Summer:  £0,000,000

Winter:  £0,000,000

Total:  £0,000,000

Expenditure
Summer:  £2,980,000

Winter:  £975,000

Total:  £3,955,000

Pre-season and friendlies
Al-Ahli preceded their 2016-17 campaign with a friendly against Jeddah Club, a tour of Spain and Qatar and faced Barcelona in the Qatar Airways Cup midway through the season.

Competitions

Overview

{| class="wikitable" style="text-align: center"
|-
!rowspan=2|Competition
!colspan=8|Record
!rowspan=2|Started round
!rowspan=2|Final position / round
!rowspan=2|First match	
!rowspan=2|Last match
|-
!
!
!
!
!
!
!
!
|-
| Professional League

| —
| 2nd
| 14 August 2016
| 4 May 2017
|-
| King Cup

| Round of 32
| Runners-up
| 20 January 2017
| 18 May 2017
|-
| Crown Prince Cup

| Round of 16
| Semi-finals
| 27 September 2016
| 27 December 2016
|-
| Champions League

| Group stage
| In Progress
| 21 February 2017
| In Progress
|-
| Saudi Super Cup

| Final
| Winners
| colspan=2|8 August 2016
|-
! Total

Saudi Super Cup
As a result of winning both the league and Kings Cup, Al-Ahli were scheduled to face Al-Hilal, who won the Crown Prince Cup, in their 1st Saudi Super Cup appearance. Al-Ahli won the match on penalties.

Pro League

League table

Results summary

Results by round

Matches
All times are local, AST (UTC+3).

King Cup
Al-Ahli entered the King Cup in the Round of 32 alongside the other Pro League teams.

Crown Prince Cup

As one of last year's finalists, Al-Ahli received a bye to the second round of the Crown Prince Cup. Al-Ahli started off their campaign by beating Al-Faisaly 2-1 at home, Al-Ahli came from behind and scored twice from the penalty spot through Omar Al Somah.

Al-Ahli were drawn away at Hajer for the quarter-finals. The game was played on 25 October 2016. The Royals won 6-1 with Omar Al-Somah scoring a hat-trick.

For the semi-finals Al-Ahli were drawn away at local rivals Al-Ittihad. The game was played on 27 December 2016. Al-Ahli lost 3-2 and were eliminated from the competition.

AFC Champions League

As league winners, Al-Ahli entered the AFC Champions League at the group stage. The draw took place on 13 December 2016 and saw Al-Ahli paired with Hazfi Cup winners Zob Ahan, UAE Pro League and 2016 AFC Champions League runners-up Al Ain, and Uzbek League runners-up Bunyodkor.

Group stage

Knockout phase

Round of 16

Statistics

Appearances

Goalscorers

Last Updated: 29 May 2017

Clean sheets

Last Updated: 12 May 2017

References

Al-Ahli Saudi FC seasons
Ahli